Jinja may refer to:

 Jinja, Uganda, a city in eastern Uganda close to the source of the Nile River
 Jinja District, Uganda, named after the above city
 Shinto shrine, also called a "jinja", a structure that houses one or more Shinto kami (spirits or phenomena)
 Jinja (template engine), for the Python programming language